Darkness Within: In Pursuit of Loath Nolder is a first-person 3D adventure / horror thriller video game. It takes place in an imaginary "Lovecraftian" place called Wellsmoth. As police detective Howard E. Loreid, players are tasked to solve the murder of Clark Field, a wealthy man involved in the occult. At the top of their list of suspects is Loath Nolder, a highly respected private investigator who mysteriously abandoned his last case for reasons unknown. Rumor had it that he ventured to several exotic places around the world. It remains a great mystery as to why Loath Nolder disappeared so suddenly, resurfacing five years later and resuming his investigations just as abruptly as he had left them. Why does this venerated P.I. now sit on the other side of the law?

This seemingly routine investigation takes a dramatic twist as strange and terrifying happenings begin to plague the player's psyche. They experience lucid horrifying dreams and are tormented by paranormal happenings. Why do days pass instead of hours when the player sleeps? What's real and what's not? As they pursue fugitive murder suspect Loath Nolder, they must face dire truths hidden deep within a haunting darkness and the recesses of their mind.

It is the first in an expected series of three games. The second game being Darkness Within 2: The Dark Lineage.

The story of the game was written with the impressions of the writer H. P. Lovecraft’s works. 
The game was temporarily without a publisher when Lighthouse Interactive went out of business. 
On June 2, 2009 it was announced that Iceberg Interactive acquired the publishing rights to this game.

Darkness Within was republished on November 14 on Steam with enhanced graphics and some more additions.

On November 3, 2015, original soundtracks of both Darkness Within 1 & 2 were officially released on Steam by Zoetrope.

Reception

Darkness Within: In Pursuit of Loath Nolder received mixed reviews upon its original release. On Metacritic, the game holds a score of 52/100 based on 15 reviews, indicating "mixed or average reviews". On GameRankings, the game holds a score of 55.50% based on 14 reviews.

IGN's Charles Onyett gave the game a 5.1/10, strongly criticizing the game's graphics for being "intensely low-budget" but praising the sound design and voice acting. Brett Todd of GameSpot was even more critical of the game, giving it a 3.5/10 while pointing out the game's lack of scares and its "bland locations and graphics".

References

External links
 Darkness Within official website
 Official demo download from GamersHell.com
 Trailer from GameTrailers.com

 Iceberg Interactive

2007 video games
Adventure games
First-person adventure games
Horror video games
Point-and-click adventure games
Single-player video games
Video games developed in Turkey
Video games set in 2011
Windows games
Video games about police officers
Video games based on works by H. P. Lovecraft
Iceberg Interactive games
Lighthouse Interactive games